Stirlingia abrotanoides is a herb or shrub of the genus Stirlingia endemic to the Wheatbelt region of Western Australia.

References

Eudicots of Western Australia
abrotanoides
Proteales of Australia
Taxa named by Carl Meissner